Illuminata may refer to:
 Illuminata (film), a 1998 American film
 Illuminata (band), an Austrian symphonic metal band formed in 2006
 Saint Illuminata (died c. 320), an Italian Christian saint

See also 
 Illuminati (disambiguation)
  (including several species of moths)